HMCS Nonsuch is a naval reserve division (NRD) located in Edmonton, Alberta. Dubbed a stone frigate, HMCS Nonsuch is a land-based naval establishment for part-time sailors as well as a local recruitment centre for the Canadian Forces Naval Reserve. It is one of 24 naval reserve divisions located in major cities across Canada.

Operations 
Nonsuch is properly referred to as a ship, being commissioned into the Royal Canadian Navy. She is part of the Reserves, and therefore operations are usually held on weekdays and certain weekends. However, her sailors may participate in any operation run by the Canadian Armed Forces year round, if they so choose.

History 
His Majesty's Canadian Ship (HMCS) Nonsuch was founded on 9 April 1923, as a Royal Canadian Naval Volunteer Reserve half-company. She was commissioned as the independent unit, HMCS Nonsuch, on 1 September 1942. During World War 2, over 3500 sailors, and 114 officers were enlisted at Nonsuch. After the war she transitioned into a peacetime force, and was paid off on 30 November 1964. She was recommissioned on September 26, 1975.

Nonsuch has two historic naval weapons outside of the building. One is a mark 12 5"/38 calibre gun, from the United States. It was originally to be used on a US Navy destroyer; however, the Second World War ended before the ship was built. The gun comes from a pair handed over to Canada for testing. The two guns were used to fire various ammunition in CFB Suffield, in southern Alberta.

The second weapon Nonsuch has is a Bliss-Leavitt Mark 9 torpedo from the Second World War, as would have been launched from Canadian destroyers.

Battle honours 
HMCS Nonsuch carries on the battle honours of 11 Royal Navy ships bearing her name in the past.

Pre-First World War 

 Kentish Knock, 1652,   
 Portland, 1653   
 Gabbard, 1653
 Texel, 1673 
 St Lucia, 1778
 The Saints, 1782

First World War 

 Jutland, 1916

Badge

Description 
Or a beaver rampant proper gorged with a collar Gules edged Or upon which a roundel displaying the device of St. George.

Etymology 
Nonsuch name comes from the French phrase  meaning "of no equal". Besides being used as a name for many former RN warships, Nonsuch was also the first overseas ship into Hudson Bay, in 1688.

References 

Canadian Forces Naval Reserve
Organizations based in Edmonton